72 (seventy-two) is the natural number following 71 and preceding 73. It is half a gross or 6 dozen (i.e., 60 in duodecimal).

In mathematics
Seventy-two is a pronic number, as it is the product of 8 and 9. 

72 is an abundant number, with a total of 12 factors, and a Euler totient of 24. 72 is also a highly totient number, as there are 17 solutions to the equation φ(x) = 72, more than any integer below 72. It is equal to the sum the sum of its preceding smaller highly totient numbers 24 and 48, and contains the first six highly totient numbers 1, 2, 4, 8, 12 and 24 as a subset of its proper divisors. 144, or twice 72, is also highly totient, as is 576, the square of 24. While 17 different integers have a totient value of 72, the sum of Euler's totient function φ(x) over the first 15 integers is 72. 72 is also a Harshad number in decimal, as it is divisible by the sum of its digits. 

72 is the smallest Achilles number, as it's a powerful number that is not itself a power.

72 is the sum of four consecutive primes (13 + 17 + 19 + 23), as well as the sum of six consecutive primes (5 + 7 + 11 + 13 + 17 + 19).

72 is the smallest number whose fifth power is the sum of five smaller fifth powers: 195 + 435 + 465 + 475 + 675 = 725.

72 is the sum of the eighth row of Lozanić's triangle.

72 is the number of distinct } magic heptagrams, all with a magic constant of 30.

72 is the number of degrees in the central angle of a regular pentagon, which is constructible with a compass and straight-edge.

72 plays a role in the Rule of 72 in economics when approximating annual compounding of interest rates of a round 6% to 10%, due in part to its high number of divisors.

Inside  Lie algebras:

 72 is the number of vertices of the six-dimensional 122 polytope, which also contains as facets 720 edges, 702 polychoral 4-faces, of which 270 are four-dimensional 16-cells, and two sets of 27 demipenteract 5-faces. These 72 vertices are the root vectors of the simple Lie group , which as a honeycomb under 222 forms the  lattice. 122 is part of a family of k22 polytopes whose first member is the fourth-dimensional 3-3 duoprism, of symmetry order 72 and made of six triangular prisms. The triangular prism is the root polytope in the k21 family of polytopes, which is the simplest semiregular polytope, with k31 rooted in the analogous four-dimensional tetrahedral prism that has four triangular prisms alongside two tetrahedra as cells.

The complex Hessian polyhedron in  contains 72 regular complex triangular edges, as well as 27 polygonal Möbius–Kantor faces and 27 vertices. It is notable for being the vertex figure of the complex Witting polytope, which shares 240 vertices with the eight-dimensional semiregular 421 polytope whose vertices in turn represent the root vectors of the simple Lie group .

There are 72 compact and paracompact Coxeter groups of ranks four through ten: 14 of these are compact finite representations in only three-dimensional and four-dimensional spaces, with the remaining 58 paracompact or noncompact infinite representations in dimensions three through nine. These terminate with three paracompact groups in the ninth dimension, of which the most important is : it contains the final semiregular hyperbolic honeycomb 621 made of only regular facets and the 521 Euclidean honeycomb as its vertex figure, which is the geometric representation of the  lattice. Furthermore,  shares the same fundamental symmetries with the Coxeter-Dynkin over-extended form ++  equivalent to the tenth-dimensional symmetries of Lie algebra . 

72 lies between the eighth pair of twin primes (71, 73), where 71 is the largest supersingular prime that is a factor of the largest sporadic group, the friendly giant, with all primes greater than or equal to 73 non-supersingular.

In science
The atomic number of hafnium
In degrees Fahrenheit considered to be room temperature.

In astronomy
Messier object M72, a magnitude 10.0 globular cluster in the constellation Aquarius.
The New General Catalogue object NGC 72, a magnitude 13.5 barred spiral galaxy in the constellation Andromeda.
The precession of equinoxes traces out a pair of cones joined at their apices in a cycle of approximately 26,000 years, that is 1 degree every 72 years (approximation to the nearmost integer).

In religion
The number of languages spoken at the Tower of Babylon, according to later tradition.
The conventional number of scholars translating the Septuagint, according to the legendary account in the "Letter of Aristeas".
The number of companions of Zoroaster who were martyred.
The conventional number of disciples sent forth by Jesus in Luke 10 in some manuscripts (seventy in others).
The number of names of God, according to Kabbalah (see names of God in Judaism).
The Shemhamphorasch related to the number of the names of God.
The total number of books in the Bible in the Catholic version if the Book of Lamentations is considered part of the Book of Jeremiah.
The current distribution of the Book of Revelation is 22 chapters, adopted since the 13th century,  but the oldest known division of the text is that of the Greek commentator Andrew of Cesary (6th century) in 72 chapters.
The number of people martyred along with Imam Hussain at the Battle of Karbala.
The number of houri each Muslim martyr (or every Muslim male, according to some ahadith) shall receive as companions in Paradise.
The degrees of the Jacob's Ladder were to the number of 72, according to the Zohar.
The 72 disciples of Confucius who mastered his teachings (also given as 77).
Mahavira, the twenty-fourth and last tirthankara of Jainism, is said to have attained nirvana after his physical death at the age of 72.
Thoth, in an Egyptian creation myth, wins a 72nd of each day of the year from the Moon in a game of draughts, as a favour to Nut, the Sky Goddess. He uses these portions to make the five intercalary days on which the remaining Gods and Goddesses are born.
The good god Osiris was enclosed in a coffin by 72 evil disciples and accomplices of Set.
At the age of the puberty, the young Parsee received the investiture of the sacred cord Kucti made of 72 linens in symbol of the community.
In Cao Đài, the number of planets between hell and heaven.
There are 72 stupas which comprise Borobudur, the world's largest Buddhist temple.
72 major temples have been found at Angkor, seat of the ancient Khmer Empire.
In Islam, 72 is the number of sects or denominations that are doomed to Hell, according to Hadith (Sayings of prophet Muhammad).
The number of demons sealed away by King Solomon with The Lesser Key of Solomon.

In other fields

Seventy-two is also:
In dots per inch (dpi), the default screen resolution for an image or graphic on an Apple Macintosh screen.
In typography, a point is 1/72 inch.
The number of the French department Sarthe.
The registry of the U.S. Navy's nuclear aircraft carrier , named after U.S. President Abraham Lincoln.
The designation of the Soviet T-72 tank.
The Rule of 72 in finance.
Book: 72 Hour Hold by Bebe Moore Campbell
CD: Seventy Two & Sunny by Uncle Kracker
Jill Clayburgh and LeVar Burton starred in Firestorm: 72 Hours in Oakland (1993)
Alternative music band The Delta 72
The Persian classical santur, a hammered dulcimer, has 72 strings in 24 triple-stringed courses.
The Turin Brakes song, also known as Emergency 72
The number of members in National Senate of Argentina.
A Civil Air Patrol unit in Laramie, WY, RMR-WY-072.
There are 72 demons and other spirits in the goetia The Lesser Key of Solomon.
A form of radio shorthand that roughly translates as meaning "Best wishes" in the QRP (low power) community
A common limit for characters per line in computing
72 equal temperament is a tuning used in Byzantine music and by some modern composers.

In sports and games
The usual par for an 18-hole golf course, especially those in tournament play.
The number of victories the Chicago Bulls achieved during the 1995-96 NBA season, which was at the time the National Basketball Association record.
The number of spaces in a game of Parcheesi, from start space to "home."

Footnotes

External links
 Go Figure: What can 72 tell us about life, BBC News, 20 July 2011

Integers